Calvinus may  refer to:

 Calvinus as the Latin form of John Calvin
 Gnaeus Domitius Calvinus
 Justus Baronius Calvinus
 Titus Veturius Calvinus
 The Swiss craft beer, see